Elizabeth (Liz) Clay (born 9 May 1995) is an Australian 100m hurdler. Her personal best of 12.71 at the Tokyo Olympics makes her the second fastest in Australian history.

Career

Early years 
She became interested in athletics after watching her younger brother Harry compete, and joined Hornsby Little Athletics as an under-10.

She made her junior international debut at the 2014 World Juniors in the 100m hurdles, but had to withdraw from the team when she broke her navicular bone weeks before the team departed. Clay then completed an exercise and sports science degree in Sydney and relocated to the Gold Coast to work with Australian hurdles coach, Sharon Hannan, who had guided Sally Pearson to Olympic gold in 2012.

Later career 
Clay ran 12.94 to win at the 2020 Melbourne Track Classic. The following year, she opened her season with 12.84 in Brisbane and followed this with a 12.72 in Canberra, both meeting the automatic qualifying standard for the 2020 Tokyo Olympics.

At the Tokyo Olympics Clay ran 12.87 seconds to finish second in her heat and reach the semi-finals, where she ran a personal best of 12.71 for third, which was not fast enough to progress to the final.

References

1995 births
Living people
Australian female hurdlers
Australian sports scientists
Athletes (track and field) at the 2020 Summer Olympics
Olympic athletes of Australia